Baron Munchausen's Narrative of his Marvellous Travels and Campaigns in Russia is a 1785 novel about a fictional German nobleman written by the German writer Rudolf Erich Raspe.

The lead character Baron Munchausen is loosely based on a real baron, Hieronymus Karl Friedrich, Freiherr von Münchhausen (1720–1797). The fictionalized character was created by Rudolf Erich Raspe.

The novel was the basis of the 1988 film The Adventures of Baron Munchausen.

Plot
An eighteenth-century German nobleman, Baron Munchausen, experiences a series of amazing adventures. He arrives at the Turkish royal court, where he meets the Sultan, steals his whole treasury, and sails away from Turkey.

References

External links
 

 The Adventures of Baron Munchausen at Google Books

German-language novels
1785 novels
1780s fantasy novels
Baron Munchausen
German novels adapted into films
German fantasy novels
Novels about nobility
Novels set in Turkey
Novels set on the Moon
Novels set in the 18th century